This is a list of vehicles made by Kenworth.

Front-engine

Cabover

Off-highway

References

Kenworth